Harmony Ranch is a studio recording released by the Western band Riders in the Sky in 1991. It is a tie-in album to the Riders' 1991 CBS children's show.

Harmony Ranch is also an 88 acre 3-season campground exclusively for Barbershop Harmony singers who enjoy singing in four part close harmony.  Located near Baldwin, Ontario, Canada, this facility has 115 permanent sites and up to 20 camping sites for tents, travel trailers and RVs. Camping sites are huge and those who are camping here will tell you that it is a very quiet place. On weekends though, it's not unusual to hear quartets singing at any of the seven  campfires.

Recreation facilities include a swimming pool, two service buildings with laundry, bathrooms and showers, a library, a second floor lounge and full kitchen, tennis/pickleball/basketball twin courts, a horseshoe pit, a baseball diamond, tetherball, children's playground, mini putt, a nature trail, a swimming pond with sandy beach, a picnic shelter accommodating 120, a small island on the Black River and an off leash park for dogs to enjoy.  

For almost 50 years, barbershoppers have enjoyed their summers for three generations. Long weekends are packed with events but otherwise, this is a peaceful and quiet family-based community. 

Camping sites for tents at $25.00/night or sites with water and 30amp power at $40.00/night for members of any of the three barbershop singing groups including the Barbershop Harmony Society, Harmony Incorporated and Sweet Adelines International or their guests. Some fully serviced lots with power, water and sewage hookups are available with an initial investment of $5,000 ($3,000 debenture returnable / refundable on vacating) and approximately $2,200 per season.  Various payment plans are available.  Some lots may have a travel trailer or a park model trailer with deck and/or a sunroom attached which are available for purchase on a site. Some trailers have been known to sell for as little as to see a list of current available lots, head to the Harmony Ranch website at Harmony-Ranch.ca

Track listing
 "Harmony Ranch" – 2:25
 "How Does He Yodel?" (Douglas Green) – 2:34
 "Great Grand Dad" (Public Doman) – 2:28
 "The Big Corral" (Public Domain) – 1:50
 "Pecos Bill" (Eliot Daniel, John Lange, Bob Nolan, Paul Smith, Tim Spencer) – 2:41
 "I Always Do" (Green) –  3:13
 "One Little Coyote" (Green) – 4:54
 "Come and Get It" – 1:58
 "The Cowboy's ABCs" (Green) – 2:30
 "Face: The Music" – 2:11
 "(Cody of the) Pony Express" (Bob Nolan) – 2:03
 "Prairie Lullabye" – 1:50

Personnel
Douglas B. Green (a.k.a. Ranger Doug)  – vocals, guitar
Paul Chrisman (a.k.a. Woody Paul) – vocals, fiddle
Fred LaBour (a.k.a. Too Slim) – vocals, string bass
Joey Miskulin – accordion
Paul Franklin – pedal steel guitar
Kenny Malone – drums, percussion
Kristin Wilkinson; Viola, String Arrangements;
Mark Casstevens – guitar, Jew's-harp, harmonica, banjo
Steve Gibson – guitar, dobro, mandolin
David Angell – violin
David Davidson – violin
Dennis Wilson – vocal arrangement
Grace Bahing – cello

Production notes
Rich Schirmer – engineer
Marshall Morgan – engineer, mixing
Bill Johnson – art direction
Brad Jones – engineer
Carlos Grier – editing
Carol Elliott – production coordination
Chrissey Follman – assistant engineer
Denny Purcell – mastering
Gary Paczosa – engineer

References / Sources
Riders in the Sky Official Website

1991 albums
Riders in the Sky (band) albums
albums produced by Steve Buckingham (record producer)
Columbia Records albums